Nils-Börje Stormbom (26 September 1925 in Vaasa – 26 November 2016 Vaasa) was a Finnish writer and recipient of the Eino Leino Prize in 1977.

References

1925 births
2016 deaths
People from Vaasa
Finnish writers in Swedish
Writers from Ostrobothnia (region)
Recipients of the Eino Leino Prize